Olenosus serrimanus is a species of beetle in the family Cerambycidae, the only species in the genus Olenosus.

References

Acanthocinini